Luke Terry O'Nien (born 21 November 1994) is an English professional footballer who currently plays as a midfielder or a defender for EFL Championship club Sunderland.

Career

Watford
O'Nien joined Watford as an Under-9. Having signed his first professional contract at Vicarage Road in July 2013, he was then called up by the first team to the pre-season friendly tour in Italy after he impressed staff during training. O'Nien was then given the number 32 shirt. He had been an unused substitute on a handful of occasions during the 2013–14 season. He made his Watford debut as an 88th-minute substitute in a 3–0 win at home to Barnsley on 15 March 2014. After the match, O'Nien reacted to his debut against Barnsley.

On 27 March 2014, O'Nien signed a one-month loan deal with Isthmian League Premier Division side Wealdstone. He made his debut as a late substitute in a win over Billericay Town on 31 March 2014, while his first start came three days later on 3 April 2014 in a 3–0 success over East Thurrock United. Following his loan spell, on 13 May 2014, O'Nien signed a new one-year deal with the Hornets. He expressed delight over signing a new contract with the club.

In August 2014, O'Nien returned to Wealdstone, now a Conference South side, on a season-long loan deal.

Following Watford's promotion to the Premier League in 2015, O'Nien was one of three released by the club following the expiration of his contract.

Wycombe Wanderers
On 25 July 2015, O'Nien signed for League Two side Wycombe Wanderers on a one-year deal, having had a successful trial with the club. In 2017, he earned the accolade of Community Player of the Season. In the 2017–18 season, the club won promotion to League One.

Sunderland 
O'Nien joined Sunderland on 30 July 2018. He scored his first goal for the club in the 2–0 away game win against Shrewsbury Town in October 2018. His second goal for the club came on 27 November 2018 and it was Sunderland's 4th, and final, goal of an entertaining 4–2 home victory against promotion rivals Barnsley. 
In March 2019, after consistent performances in an unfamiliar right back role in which he won multiple man of the match awards. At the end of the 2018–19 Season O'Nien picked up the award of Young Player of The Season. In his first season at Sunderland, O'Nien got attacked by a Portsmouth fan at Fratton Park after he got accidentally pushed into the stands by a player on the opposing team. O'Nien appeared to get punched, kicked and hurled abuse at by nearby Portsmouth fans. However, O'Nien wasn't injured and didn't end up pressing charges.

Following an impressive 2020–21 season, O'Nien was named in the 2020–21 EFL League One Team of the Season at the league's annual awards ceremony on 29 April 2021.

On 6 July 2021, O’Nien signed a new three-year contract extension with Sunderland.

Personal life
O'Nien was born in Hemel Hempstead, Hertfordshire. He attended John F Kennedy Catholic School. His father Terry was a professional golfer. 

Owing to his ancestries, O'Nien is eligible to play international football for either the England or Singapore national teams.

O'Nien has family members in Singapore, and subsequently is eligible to play for Singapore through his Singaporean-born maternal grandfather. His great-uncle is Lim Kim San, a prominent local politician who played a role in the development of Singapore, particularly in the country's prominent public housing projects.

Career statistics

Honours
Sunderland
 EFL League One play-offs: 2022
EFL Trophy: 2020–21 

Individual
EFL League One Team of the Season: 2020–21

References

External links

1994 births
Living people
English footballers
Association football midfielders
Watford F.C. players
Wealdstone F.C. players
Wycombe Wanderers F.C. players
English Football League players
Isthmian League players
National League (English football) players
English people of Singaporean descent
British Asian footballers